WYSP may refer to:

 WYSP (FM), a radio station (88.1 FM) licensed to Dushore, Pennsylvania, United States
 WIP-FM, a radio station (94.1 FM) licensed to Philadelphia, Pennsylvania, which held the call sign WYSP until 2011